King of Rock is the second studio album by American hip hop group Run-D.M.C., released on January 21, 1985, by Profile Records. The album was produced by Russell Simmons and Larry Smith. King of Rock became the first rap album released on CD. The album saw the group adopting a more rock-influenced sound, with several tracks prominently featuring heavy guitar riffs. The song "Roots, Rap, Reggae" features Yellowman, and was one of the first hybrids of rap and dancehall.

King of Rock peaked at number 52 on the Billboard 200, and number 12 on the Top R&B/Hip Hop Albums chart. The album was first certified as Gold on June 3, 1985, before it was certified as Platinum by the RIAA on February 18, 1987. The album features four Billboard chart singles: "King of Rock", "You Talk Too Much", "Jam-Master Jammin'" and "Can You Rock It Like This". "King of Rock" peaked at number 80 on the UK Singles Chart on March 16, 1985.

King of Rock was ranked at number 44 on NME's list of the 50 Albums Released In 1985 That Still Sound Great Today. "King of Rock" featured a popular music video, which became a fan favorite on MTV. It featured Calvert DeForest, also known as Larry "Bud" Melman of NBC's Late Night with David Letterman fame. King of Rock was reissued by Arista Records in 1999 and 2003. An expanded and remastered edition was released in 2005 and contained 4 previously unreleased songs.

Background
On their sophomore album, King of Rock, Run-D.M.C. expanded their musical palette. The album's title itself was equal parts warning, statement of purpose, and legitimate boast. The album signified the group's intentions to pull hip-hop out of the periphery and onto center stage. It was a golden era in the evolution of contemporary music; a time and place in which hip-hop was called "rap", MTV defined "rock", and Run-D.M.C. were kings of both.

The music on the album was created by Larry Smith's group Orange Krush using the drum machine Oberheim DMX and Jam Master Jay's scratches mixed in a guitar riff. D.M.C. once commented on this fact: "People forget about Larry Smith, but Larry Smith owned hip-hop and rap. He produced our first two albums, and he produced Whodini. The rock-rap sound was Larry Smith's vision, not Rick Rubin's. Rick changed the story, but Larry was there first. Actually, me and Run were against the guitar."

The name for the album came up with Corey Robbins, co-owner of Profile Records. He said: "I don't take any credit for the song title, but I did come up with the idea of calling the album that, based on the song title, and keeping it singular. It was so outrageous then-that rappers would call themselves kings of rock, instead of kings of rap. That would've been the obvious title, because they were the kings of rap. They certainly weren't considered rock – yet. Which is why it turned out to be such a cool title: it turned out to be true. They did become rock and roll, in a way; they did get played on rock radio. King of Rap or Kings of Rap would have done nothing for them. King Of Rock was outrageous."

Run-D.M.C.'s version of the Beastie Boys "Slow and Low" was recorded as a demo during the sessions for this album and was not officially released until 2005, as an inclusion in the Deluxe edition of King of Rock.

The song "Can You Rock It Like This" was written by a 16-year-old LL Cool J.

"King of Rock" featured a popular music video, which became a fan favorite on MTV. It featured Calvert DeForest, also known as Larry "Bud" Melman of NBC's Late Night with David Letterman fame.

Appearance in movies
Three songs from this album were featured in the 1985 Warner Bros. film Krush Groove: "King of Rock", "Can You Rock It Like This" and "You're Blind".

Accolades
 NME – no. 44 at "50 Albums Released In 1985 That Still Sound Great Today" (2015)
 Rockerilla – no. 12 at "Best Black Music Album 1985" (1985)
 Ego Trip – no. 8 at "Hip-Hop's Greatest Albums By Year 1979–85" (1999)
 XXL – "40 Years of Hip-Hop: Top 5 Albums by Year" (2014)
 Complex – no. 50 at "The Best Rap Albums of the '80s" (2017)

Track listing

Chart positions
The album spent 56 weeks on the U.S. Billboard album charts and reached its peak position of number 52 in early March 1985.

Album

Singles

Notes:

 1 – Charted with "Darryl and Joe (Krush-Groove 3)"

Certifications

References

External links
 King of Rock at Discogs
 King of Rock at Genius.com

1985 albums
Run-DMC albums
Profile Records albums
Albums produced by Larry Smith (producer)
Albums recorded at Greene St. Recording